King Kang of Zhou, personal name Ji Zhao, was the third sovereign of the Chinese Zhou Dynasty and son of King Cheng of Zhou. The dates of his reign are 1020–996 BC or 1005–978 BC.

King Kang followed his father's policy and expanded the Zhou territory in the North and in the West. He also repressed a rebellion in the east. Life prospered in the Zhou Dynasty under Kang’s rule.

His was succeeded by his son King Zhao of Zhou.

Family
Queens:
 Wang Jiang, of the Jiang clan, the mother of Crown Prince Xia

Sons:
 Crown Prince Xia (1027–977 BC), ruled as King Zhao of Zhou from 995–977 BC

Ancestry

See also
 Family tree of ancient Chinese emperors

References

996 BC deaths
Zhou dynasty kings
11th-century BC Chinese monarchs
10th-century BC Chinese monarchs
Year of birth unknown